Manquehue is an underground metro station on the Line 1 of the Santiago Metro, in Santiago, Chile. It is part of the  eastern extension of the Line 1. The station was opened on 7 January 2010 as part of the extension of the line from Escuela Militar to Los Dominicos,

The station consists of a platform tunnel and three transepts containing a mezzanine each, which are connected by a bridge that is suspended from the tunnel ceiling by tie rods. Each mezzanine is accessed via two entrances on both sides of Apoquindo Avenue.

References

Santiago Metro stations
Railway stations opened in 2010
2010 establishments in Chile
Santiago Metro Line 1